(June 10, 1907 – October 5, 2001) was a politician, journalist, also Mayor of Naha city.  Senaga was an outspoken critic of American oppression on Okinawa and was imprisoned by American military authorities for sheltering Communists. He was a mayor in Naha and a prominent political figure during the American occupation of Okinawa.  However, he was removed when military authorities arbitrarily changed Okinawan election ordinances. Senaga was a strong advocate for the reversion of Okinawa, which was initially opposed by the American military. Later, he served as a representative of the Japanese Communist Party in the Diet, in the House of Representatives, before retiring from politics in 1990.

References 
 Cary, James (1963). Japan Today: Reluctant ally. New York: Praeger.
 http://two--plus--two.blogspot.com/2007/10/anti-us-okinawa-activist-senagas-prison.html (accessed 2 Dec. 2007)
 U.S. News & World Report (1957). Red mayor on key U.S. Base

1907 births
2001 deaths
Japanese Communist Party politicians
Japanese prisoners and detainees
Mayors of places in Okinawa Prefecture
Members of the House of Representatives (Japan)
People from Okinawa Prefecture